Ivan Brandt (1903–1972) was a British stage and film actor. He was born Roy Francis Cook to Charles Cook and Anna Maria (née Green).

Filmography

References

Bibliography
 Goble, Alan. The Complete Index to Literary Sources in Film. Walter de Gruyter, 1999.

External links

1903 births
1972 deaths
People from Lambeth
British male stage actors
British male film actors